Yeghishe Darian, also spelled Yeguiché or Jeugiche, was a Lebanese footballer who played as a full-back.

He played for DPHB and Homenetmen at club level, and the Lebanon national team internationally. Darian took part in Lebanon's first international match against Mandatory Palestine in 1940, and played for Beirut XI in 1946.

References

External links
 

Year of birth missing
Year of death missing
Lebanese people of Armenian descent
Ethnic Armenian sportspeople
Association football fullbacks
Lebanese footballers
Lebanese Premier League players
AS DPHB players
Homenetmen Beirut footballers
Lebanon international footballers